The Mycotyphaceae are a family of fungi in the order Mucorales. Members of this family, rarely reported, are thought to be more common in warmer climates.

Description

Species in this family have sporangiola borne on dehiscent pedicels.

Systematics

The family comprises a single genus with three species:

 Mycotypha africana Novak & Backus, 1963
 Mycotypha indica P.M. Kirk & Benny, 1985
 Mycotypha microspora Fenner, 1932 (generic type species)

References

External links

 Index Fungorum

Zygomycota